Darcie is a feminine given name. Notable people with the name include:

Darcie Dohnal (born 1972), American short track speed skater
Darcie Edgemon, children's book author
Darcie Vincent (born 1970), women's basketball coach

See also
Darcy (disambiguation)

Feminine given names